The Lovers Arrive  is a 1956 Greek black and white comedy film made by Anzervos and based on a theatrical play O erastis erhete (Ο εραστής έρχεται) by Georgios Roussos.  It was directed and written by Giorgos Tzavellas.

Plot

Mina arrives from Patras to visit her cousin LEla. On their way to Lela's house Lela confesses that her husband, Potis, doesn't pay much attention to her and their marriage due to his work in as an owner of a soap manufacturing factory. Then Mina advises Lela to let Potis understand that she had an affair with someone called Pipis (diminutive of Spyros [or Spyrus]).  In the start, he doesn't realise the game that Lela plays, but after he meets with his best man Markos, who has just learnt that his wife had a relationship with another man, Potis changes his mind and starts to be suspicious of his wife. After the collection of some "clues" and the "precious" advice by Markos, he concludes that the lover of his wife is his neighbour Spyros. Spyros has a very jealous wife, Jenny, and when Lela tells Potis that she aims to go on an excursion in Zoumperi, and Spyrus goes to Thebes for a professional affair, Potis thinks he will surprise Spyros and Lela and proves that his wife has a lover. So he collaborates with envious Jenny and they put a recorder in Spyros' car to record Lela's and Spyros dialogue. But instead the recorder catches a dialogue between Jenny and Potis and now he and Jenny seem to be lovers! But the next morning Markos, Potis and Spyros meet at a cafe and the truth is revealed. Markos was responsible because he was cinemaholic and he thought that what happened in the films he watched happened also in the real life. Lastly, Mina has a wedding proposal by phone, she leaves for Patras to marry, Spyros and Jenny go to Thebes together, and Markos and his wife return home, all these with Spyros' car. And Lela and Potis love each other again and they together close the door of the garden with Potis promising not to forget her and their marriage again due to the soaps.

Cast
 Vassilis Logothetidis ..... Potis Antonopoulos
 Ilya Livykou ..... Lela Antonopoulou
 Vangelis Protopappas ..... Markos Manolopoulos
 Smaro Stefanidou ..... Mina Moutsopoulou
 Lambros Konstantaras ..... Spyros Argyriou
 Kaiti Lambropoulou ..... Jenny Argyriou
 Kyveli Theochari ..... Kiki Manolopoulou
 Nikos Rizos ..... Mistos
 Taigeti ..... Ms. Kokkinou
 Antigone Koukouli ..... Katina
 Nikos Kazis ..... Pipis

See also
List of Greek films

External links

O ziliarogatos at cine.gr

1956 films
1956 comedy films
1950s Greek-language films
Films scored by Manos Hatzidakis
Greek comedy films
Greek black-and-white films